La Voz Senior (season 1) is a Spanish reality talent show that premiered on 8 May 2019 on Antena 3. Based on the reality singing competition The Voice Senior, the series was created by Dutch television producer John de Mol. It is part of an international series.

This was La Voz Senior'''s first season on Antena 3, after La Voz and La Voz Kids''. The coaching panel includes David Bisbal, Paulina Rubio, Pablo López, Antonio Orozco; all of whom have served as coaches on the adult version.

Helena Bianco won the season, marking Pablo Lopez's first and only win as a coach.

Teams

  Winner
  Runner-up
  Third Place
  Fourth Place
  Artist was Eliminated in Semifinal
  Artist was Eliminated in Knockouts Round

« Audiciones a ciegas » (Blind Auditions) 
The blind auditions aired from May 8 to May 29, 2019. Coaches had to fill their teams with 5 artists each.

Episode 1 (8 May 2019)

Episode 2 (15 May 2019)

Episode 3 (22 May 2019)

Episode 4 (29 May 2019)

« Asaltos » (Knockouts)

Episode 5 (5 June 2019)

Episode 6: (12 June 2019)

« Directos » (Live Shows)

Semi-final

Finale

Elimination chart

Overall
Color key
Artist's info

Result details

2020 Spanish television seasons